Dan Buettner (born June 18, 1960) is an American National Geographic Fellow and New York Times-bestselling author. He is an explorer, educator, author, producer, storyteller and public speaker. He co-produced an Emmy Award-winning documentary, and holds three Guinness records for endurance cycling. Buettner is the founder of Blue Zones, LLC.

Biography

Early life
Dan Buettner was born on June 18, 1960 in Saint Paul, Minnesota. After graduating from the College of St. Thomas in 1984, Buettner took a year to explore Spain before taking a job with National Public Radio in Washington, D.C. to recruit celebrity participation in a fund-raising croquet tournament with journalist George Plimpton.

Education
Buettner graduated from the University of St. Thomas in 1982. Soon thereafter he went to work for The Washington Post columnist Remar Sutton and Paris Review Editor George Plimpton to organize the National Public Radio’s Celebrity Croquet Tournament.

Early expeditions
In 1986, Buettner and his brother launched the first of several Guinness World Records for transcontinental cycling . "Americastrek" traversed 15,536 miles from Prudhoe Bay, Alaska to Tierra del Fuego, Argentina; the 1990 "Sovietrek" followed the 45th parallel around the world, covered 12,888 miles, as Buettner recounted the trip in his book Sovietrek. In 1992, the Buettner brothers team-cycled from Bizerte, Tunisia, to Cape Agulhas, South Africa, "Africatrek" with cyclist Dr. Chip Thomas; the team covered 11,885 miles over eight months. Buettner’s book, Africatrek: A Journey by Bicycle through Africa, won the Young Reader Award from Scientific American.

MayaQuest

In February 1995, Buettner developed a genre of exploration that enabled online audiences to direct teams of experts to solve mysteries. His MayaQuest [USA Today CITATION] expedition sought to help solve the mystery of the 9th century Maya Collapse. Carrying laptop computers and a newly demilitarized satellite dish the expedition interacted with classrooms that helped determine exploration route and findings. Hamline University’s Center for Global Environmental Education created a framework for schools to use the expedition as a multi-disciplinary teaching themes. Both Africatrek and MayaQuest were adapted into educational computer games by MECC in the late 1990s.

Businesses

In 1995, Buettner founded Earthtreks, Inc. to manage his expeditions. He sold the company to Classroom Connect in 1997 but continued to lead expeditions until 2002. His team retraced Darwin’s route in the Galapagos and followed Marco Polo’s trail on the Silk Road, explored the collapse of the Anasazi Civilization and traced the origins of Western Civilization.

When Buettner realized that adults were also following his expeditions, he approached National Geographic with the idea to research longevity hotspots and was given support to move forward. He then met with Robert Kane, as of 2016 the Director, Center on Aging, at the University of Minnesota, who introduced him to demographers and scientists at the National Institute on Aging (NIA) in Washington, DC. Buettner was awarded a grant from the National Institute of Aging. Previous research identified the longevity hotspots of Sardinia, Okinawa, and Loma Linda.

In 2003, Buettner began leading trips to these destinations while collaborating with a variety of experts, including anthropologists, historians, dietitians, and geneticists, "to reverse engineer longevity". His early trips focused on Sardinia, Italy; Okinawa, Japan; and Monterrey, Nuevo Leon and Loma Linda, California.

Blue Zones
In 2003, Buettner formed Blue Zones LLC. Buettner reported his findings of communities with increased longevity, identified as blue zones, in his cover story for National Geographic Magazine'''s November 2005 edition, "Secrets of Long Life."

In 2006, under aegis of National Geographic, Buettner collaborated with Michel Poulain and Costa Rican demographer Dr. Luis Rosero-Bixby to identify a fourth longevity hotspot in the Nicoya Peninsula. In 2008, again working with Poulain, he found a fifth longevity hotspot on the Greek Island of Ikaria. In April 2008, Buettner released a book on his findings, The Blue Zones: Lessons for Living Longer From the People Who've Lived the Longest, through National Geographic Books. It became a New York Times Best Seller and resulted in interviews for Buettner on The Oprah Winfrey Show, The Dr. Oz Show, and Anderson Cooper 360, among other national media.

In September 2009, Buettner gave a TED talk on the topic, titled "How to live to be 100+", which, as of this date, has over two million views. In October 2010, he released the book Thrive: Finding Happiness the Blue Zones Way, largely based on research taking a data-based approach to identify the statistically happiest regions of the happiest countries on Earth. He argues that creating lasting happiness is only achievable through optimizing the social and physical environments.

In April 2015, Buettner published The Blue Zones Solution: Eating and Living Like the World's Healthiest People which listed Ikaria (in Greece), Okinawa (Japan), Sardinia (Italy), Loma Linda (California), and Costa Rica as the places with top longevity. It became a New York Times Best Seller. The book was featured on the cover of Parade, and Buettner was interviewed extensively on national media.
 
In 2019, Buettner and National Geographic photograph David McLain revisited all of the Blue Zones to study diet; based on this, Buettner and Mclain wrote Blue Zones Kitchen. In 2020, Blue Zones LLC was acquired by the Adventist Health System.

AARP/Blue Zones Vitality Project

In 2008, inspired by Finland’s North Karelia Project, Buettner designed a plan to apply his Blue Zones principles to an American town. He auditioned five cities and chose Albert Lea, Minnesota for the AARP/Blue Zones Vitality Project, where he believed the key to success involved focusing on the ecology of health—creating a healthy environment rather than relying on individual behaviors.

Walter Willett, chair of the department of nutrition at the Harvard School of Public Health, found the results "stunning". As a whole, the community showed an 80% increase in walking and biking; 49% decrease in city worker’s healthcare claims, and 4% reduction in smoking. The community shed 12,000 pounds, walked 75 million steps, and added three years to their average life expectancy. City officials reported a 40% drop in health care costs.

Blue Zones Project

In 2010, Buettner partnered with Healthways, a global health and well-being company, to scale the Blue Zones city work under the rubric of Blue Zones Projects. The Blue Zones Project team partnered Beach Cities Health District in Southern California to apply Blue Zone principles to three California communities—Redondo Beach, Hermosa Beach, and Manhattan Beach. Their work occasioned the lowering of BMI by 14% and smoking by 30%, as well as increasing healthy eating and exercise.

In 2011, the Blue Zones Project joined forces with Wellmark Blue Cross and Blue Shield to deliver the Blue Zones Project, across the State of Iowa as the cornerstone of the Governor’s Healthiest State Initiative and is at work in 18 cities there to effect change. In 2013, projects began in Fort Worth, Texas and on Hawaii.

In 2014, work began in Naples, Florida, South Bend, Indiana and Klamath Falls, Oregon. In 2018, Klamath Falls was recognized by the Robert Wood Johnson Foundation (RWJF) as the "Culture of Health" prize winner

Public speaking
Bill Clinton’s Global Initiative, 2013
Tiger21, 2015
Google Zeitgeist, 2012
TEDxTC 2009 (Minneapolis/St. Paul), independently organized TED event.

Personal life
Buettner and American model Cheryl Tiegs ended a relationship on January 1, 2009.

Bibliography

 Buettner, Dan. (February 25, 2002) Scary Canoe Stories. The Rake.

 Buettner, Dan (May 2015) Want Great Longevity and Health? It Takes a Village. "The secrets of the world’s longest-lived people include community, family, exercise and plenty of beans." The Wall Street Journal''
 Buettner, Dan, (2017). The blue zones of happiness: lessons from the world's happiest people. Washington, D.C.: National Geographic .

References

Further reading

External links
 (BlueZones)
BlueZones Facebook
Dan Buettner talks about Sovietrek and his other adventures with anthropologist Jack Weatherford, in Northern Lights Minnesota Author Interview TV Series, #347 (1995):  [https://reflections.mndigital.org/catalog/p16022coll38:369#/kaltura_video] 

1960 births
American explorers
American health and wellness writers
American travel writers
Diet food advocates
Living people
People from Saint Paul, Minnesota